Francisco Regalón Cerezo (born 19 February 1987) is a Spanish professional footballer who plays as a central defender.

Club career
Born in Algallarín, Córdoba, Andalusia, Regalón finished his development with Atlético Madrid, spending six full seasons with the reserves in the Segunda División B and making his debut in the competition on 12 February 2006 in a 1–1 away draw against AD Alcorcón. In the 2011–12 campaign, he scored a career-best five goals in 35 matches.

Regalón left the Colchoneros to join CD Numancia in June 2012, signing a one-year contract. He made his Segunda División debut on 18 August, in a 2–0 home win against Sporting de Gijón. He netted his first goal for the Soria club on 25 November, helping to a 4–2 away victory over Real Madrid Castilla.

On 23 March 2017, Regalón cut ties with Numancia and signed for Cultural y Deportiva Leonesa just hours later. On 1 August, after achieving promotion to the second tier, he moved to Racing de Santander.

Honours
Cultural Leonesa
Segunda División B: 2016–17

References

External links

1987 births
Living people
Spanish footballers
Footballers from Andalusia
Association football defenders
Segunda División players
Segunda División B players
Tercera División players
Atlético Madrid C players
Atlético Madrid B players
CD Numancia players
Cultural Leonesa footballers
Racing de Santander players
CD Castellón footballers
Spain youth international footballers